is a district located in Shiribeshi Subprefecture, Hokkaido, Japan.

As of 2004, the district has an estimated population of 5,949 and a density of 13.23 persons per km2. The total area is 449.68 km2.

Towns
Rankoshi

Districts in Hokkaido